The 11701 / 11702 Jabalpur- Indore Intercity Express is a tri-weekly Express inter city train service which runs between Indore Junction railway station of Indore, the largest city and commercial hub of the central Indian state of Madhya Pradesh, and Jabalpur, a major city in Madhya Pradesh, India.

Coaches
The 11701 / 02 Jabalpur - Indore Junction Intercity Express has 11 general unreserved & two SLR (seating with luggage rake) coaches . It does not carry a pantry car coach.

As is customary with most train services in India, coach composition may be amended at the discretion of Indian Railways depending on demand.

Service

Routing

Traction
As the route is going to electrification, a  based WDM-5 Electric locomotive pulls the train to its destination.

See also
 Indore–Jaipur Express
 Indore–Ajmer Express
 Veer Bhumi Chittaurgarh Express
 Bhopal–Jodhpur Express
 Jabalpur–Jodhpur Express

References

External links
11701 Intercity Express at India Rail Info
11702 Intercity Express at India Rail Info

Rail transport in Madhya Pradesh
Transport in Indore
Transport in Jabalpur
Intercity Express (Indian Railways) trains